Terrace Reservoir is located in Conejos County, Colorado northwest of the town of Capulin. It is surrounded by the Rio Grande National Forest. The reservoir is owned by the Terrace Irrigation Company, which uses the water it stores to irrigate agricultural crops in the nearby San Luis Valley.

State wildlife area
The lake and the land immediately surrounding it are also designated as the Terrace Reservoir State Wildlife Area. The wildlife area offers hunting and fishing.

Dam
The dam (National ID # CO00815) is an earthen dam built in 1912. It is split into two sections, with a mountain in the middle separating the two. The reservoir drains to the Alamosa River through a penstock on the southern segment of the dam. The spillway, which is on the northern dam segment, was replaced sometime after 2012.

References

External links
Terrace Reservoir State Wildlife Area

Reservoirs in Colorado
Lakes of Conejos County, Colorado
Protected areas of Conejos County, Colorado
Wildlife management areas of Colorado